Louisiana Love Call is a 1992 studio album by Maria Muldaur. The album was her debut for Black Top Records and was recorded at Ultrasonic Studio in New Orleans. An homage to Crescent City soul, the album featured a host of New Orleans musicians including David Torkanowsky, Cranston Clements, Herman Ernest and Dr. John. The title track features a duet with Aaron Neville.

The album received a number of positive reviews, many of which are rounded up on Muldaur's website, with Rolling Stone declaring it as "the best recording of her career". Louisiana Love Call was remastered and re-released by Shout Factory in 2005.

Track listing

Personnel 
 Maria Muldaur - vocals, tambourine
 Accordion – Zachary Richard (tracks: 3)
 Backing Vocals – Aaron Neville (tracks: 1,3), Charles Neville (tracks: 1), Lucy Burnett (tracks: 5, 7), Phillip Manuel (tracks: 5, 7)
 Bass – Chris Severin
 Drums – Hermon V. Ernest III
 Guitar – Amos Garrett, Cranston Clements
 Harmonica – Laurence Jacobs (tracks: 11)
 Percussion – Alfred Roberts (tracks: 1), Kenneth Williams
 Piano, Organ, Keyboards – David Torkanowsky
 Saxophone – Mark Kazanoff
 Soprano Saxophone – Charles Neville (tracks: 4)
 Tenor Saxophone – Ernest Youngblood, Jr
 Trumpet – Jamil Sharif
 Vocals, Piano – Dr. John

References 

1992 albums
Maria Muldaur albums
Black Top Records albums